1st otdeleniya sovkhoza 'Novousmanskiy' is a rural locality (a settlement) in Babyakovskoye Rural Settlement of Novousmansky District, Russia. The population was 1185 as of 2010. The village is part of the village of Babiakovo and is located in the forest-steppe zone. There are 19 streets.

Geography 
The settlement is located 20 km southwest of Novaya Usman (the district's administrative centre) by road. Maslovka is the nearest rural locality.

References 

Rural localities in Novousmansky District